
Gmina Kępno is an urban-rural gmina (administrative district) in Kępno County, Greater Poland Voivodeship, in west-central Poland.

Villages
Apart from the town of Kępno, Gmina Kępno contains the villages and settlements of Biały Młyn, Borek Mielęcki, Domanin, Dziekania, Hanulin, Kierzenko, Kierzno, Kliny, Krążkowy, Mechnice, Mikorzyn, Myjomice, Olszowa, Osiny, Ostrówiec, Przybyszów, Pustkowie Kierzeńskie, Rzetnia, Świba, Szklarka Mielęcka and Zosin.

Neighbouring gminas
Gmina Kępno is bordered by the gminas of Baranów, Bralin, Doruchów, Kobyla Góra, Ostrzeszów and Wieruszów.

References
Polish official population figures 2006

Kepno
Kępno County